Louise Alone Thompson Patterson (September 9, 1901 – August 27, 1999) was an American social activist and college professor. Thompson was acquainted with many of the leading literary figures during the Harlem Renaissance of the 1920s and 1930s, spending most of her life involved in civil rights. Thompson Patterson is also known as one of the first Black women to be enrolled into the University of California at Berkeley.

Early years 
Born in Chicago, Illinois, Patterson graduated from the University of California, Berkeley in 1923. She became a professor at the renowned Hampton Institute, a historically black college (HBCU) in Virginia by age twenty-two and she worked there for five years. Patterson moved to New York to join the burgeoning artistic community in Harlem. When she first went to New York, she pursued social work, but eventually she became a central figure in the literary movement.

Trans-national activism 
Though Thompson organized a number of protests and opened one of the premiere Harlem salons, she became best known for her close friendship with the author Langston Hughes. Both admired the Soviet system of government. Thompson founded a Harlem chapter of the Friends of the Soviet Union in 1932. The American Communist Party selected Thompson to organize a group of twenty-two Harlem writers, artists, and intellectuals to create a film about discrimination in the United States for a Soviet film company. Many important individuals of the Harlem Renaissance were a part of this group, such as authors Dorthy West and Langston Hughes. After the project fell through due to lack of funding, and pressures from U.S. business officials to pull away from future diplomatic relations with the Soviet Union, Thompson and Hughes returned to the United States to found the Harlem Suitcase Theater, which presented plays written by Hughes and other Black writers and featured all-Black casts. In 1932 Thompson led a group of African American actors who traveled together to visit the Soviet Union.

Domestic activism 
After graduating from college, Patterson taught at Virginia's Hampton Institute, where she led a student uprising against the predominantly white administration's paternalistic policies. Throughout the protests, on each Sunday afternoon the African-American students that attended Hampton constantly sang old-time plantation songs towards white visitors. Afterwards, Patterson was quite unwelcome at the Institute. This forced her to move to New York City, rapidly becoming involved with many members of the Harlem Renaissance. This was due to her affiliation and a being a member of the Urban Institute that helped fund her career at the New York School of Social Work.

Patterson also became involved and organized several protests over the conviction of the Scottsboro boys. In Alabama, a woman accused nine young African-American boys of committing an act of rape against her. Patterson is also credited with helping create the Sojourners for Truth and Justice which were a radical civil rights organization led by African American women such as Shirley Graham Du Bois and Charlotta Bass from 1951 to 1952. They viewed Black women as a vessel that would help bring about social change to a country that they believed was against women and African-Americans.

It is important to note that Thompson's political involvement included literary critiques as well. In her groundbreaking article, "Toward a Brighter Dawn," Thompson expressed her concern for the plight of Black household workers. Focusing on the Bronx slave market, Thompson detailed how Black women are the most exploited section of the American working class population due to the intersection of their racial, gender, and class identities. The use of the term "triple exploitation" was the first time it explicitly appeared in print, marking a significant moment in the history of Black feminism.

Marriage and family 

She had a short marriage to the writer Wallace Thurman. Thompson married Thurman in August 1928 but their marriage broke up six months later when she reached the conclusion that he was homosexual. She later married William L. Patterson, a prominent member of the American Communist Party.

Later Years
She joined her husband in protesting the anti-Communist policies of Senator Joseph McCarthy in the 1950s. In the 1960s, she was involved in the Civil Rights Movement, though by that time her influence was greatly overshadowed by more notable figures.

Patterson died of natural causes on August 27, 1999, shortly before her ninety-eighth birthday, in New York City. For the remainder of her life, Patterson had continued to be active in political and social issues.

Legacy
In 2012 Patterson was profiled in California Magazine, a publication for alumni of the University of California, Berkeley.

Patterson provided insight on daily life as an African-American individual during the "early West" using the events that place in her life as the broader changes and issues facing civil rights in America as well as highlighting those issues overseas in Russia. Going against the status quo, Patterson, amongst many other black female Social Activist during this era helped pave the way for future activists pertaining to civil rights issues in the United States.

External links
 FBI file on Louise Thompson Patterson
Sojourners of Truth and Justice
Stuart A. Rose Manuscript, Archives, and Rare Book Library, Emory University: Louise Thompson Patterson papers, 1909-1999

Further reading

 Howard, Walter T. We Shall Be Free!: Black Communist Protests in Seven Voices. Philadelphia, PA: Temple University Press, 2013.
 McDuffie, Erik S., Sojourning for Freedom: Black Women, American Communism, and the Making of Black Left Feminism
Roman, M. L, Opposing Jim Crow: African Americans and the Soviet Indictment of U.S. Racism, 2012
Keith Gilyard, Louise Thompson Patterson: A Life of Struggle for Justice, published by Duke University Press, 2017.

References 

1901 births
1999 deaths
African-American academics
Activists for African-American civil rights
People from Chicago
Harlem Renaissance
Women civil rights activists
20th-century African-American people